Doom Days (stylised as "DOOM D∆YS") is the third studio album by British indie pop band Bastille, released on 14 June 2019 by Virgin EMI Records. It was preceded by the release of the four singles "Quarter Past Midnight", "Doom Days", "Joy" and "Those Nights", and followed by "Another Place". "Those Nights" was premiered on Beats 1 with Zane Lowe on 4 June 2019. The band played music festivals in the UK and across Europe from May to August 2019 in support of the album. An extended version of the album was released in 6 December 2019 with 11 extra tracks.

Background
The album was described as a concept album about a "colourful" night at a party, as well as "the importance of escapism, hope and the preciousness of close friendships". The party was additionally described as having an atmosphere of "turbulent emotional chaos" and "euphoria, carelessness and a small dose of madness". Each song is set at a specific time during this night; these times were also revealed through the Doom Days Society website.

Promotion
In addition to its four singles, the album's track listing was revealed through the website Doom Days Society on 2 May, where the band revealed each track in order with a short introductory video.

Critical reception

On Metacritic, Doom Days received a score of 72 out of 100 from nine critics, indicating "generally favorable" reception. In a positive review, Rhian Daly of NME called the album "a vivid snapshot of humanity and an imaginative, adventurous levelling up from one of Britain's most influential bands."

Track listing
All tracks written by Dan Smith.

Charts

Weekly charts

Year-end charts

Certifications

References

2019 albums
Bastille (band) albums
Universal Music Group albums
Virgin EMI Records albums
Virgin Records albums